The secretary of education is the member of the Cabinet of the Philippines in charge of the Department of Education (DepEd).

The current secretary is Sara Duterte, who assumed office on June 30, 2022.

List

References

 
Education
Philippines